Camp Casablanca was a military base located in the city of Suva Reka, Kosovo. From 1999 to 2012 it has been home to many foreign NATO troops, including German forces, and it occasionally houses U.S. troops as well.  Austrian and Swiss troops were also located here. The camp was originally established by the German Army to maintain a NATO peacekeeping presence after the Kosovo War of 1999. The base was operational until 17 March 2012, when the premises were transferred to Suva Reka municipality for development.

References

Military installations of Germany
Military of Austria
Kosovo War
Suva Reka
NATO intervention in the former Yugoslavia